Mlungisi Ngece (born 18 September 1966) is a South African former cricketer. He played in one first-class and one List A match for Border in 1997 and 2005 respectively.

See also
 List of Border representative cricketers

References

External links
 

1966 births
Living people
South African cricketers
Border cricketers
Sportspeople from Qonce